Maldita Vecindad y los Hijos del Quinto Patio is the self-titled debut album recorded by the band Maldita Vecindad from Mexico City. The ska-induced long play was released on October 26, 1989 under the RCA International label.

Track listing
 Apañón
 Rafael
 Morenaza
 Mujer
 Mojado
 Bailando
 Apariencias
 El Supermercado
 

1989 debut albums
Maldita Vecindad albums